The following is a timeline of the history of the city of Ciudad Juárez, Chihuahua, Mexico.

Prior to 20th century

 1659  Mission de Nuestra Señora de Guadalupe founded.
 1681/2  Town founded.
 1682 – Ysleta Mission established.
 1826  Town named "Villa Paso del Norte."
 1846
 The Mexican–American War begins
 The Battle of El Bracito is fought nearby on 25 December
 1848 – Across the Rio Grande, El Paso becomes part of the U.S. state of Texas per Treaty of Guadalupe Hidalgo.
 1865  HQ of Benito Juárez the 26th president of Mexico, 18581872.
 1884  Mexican Central Railway opened, linking Mexico City to Ciudad Juárez.
 1888
 El Paso del Norte renamed "Juárez" in honor of Benito Juárez.
 Customs Office building constructed.
 1895  Population: 6,917.

20th century

 1906 -  (school) founded.

 1909 - William Howard Taft - Porfirio Díaz, historic first Presidential summit and the near assassination of both Presidents.
 1910 - Biblioteca Municipal (library) established.
 1911
 April–May: Battle of Ciudad Juárez (1911); city taken by revolutionaries.
 World's "first" aerial reconnaissance flown via airplane (El Paso-Ciudad Juarez), for Mexican government.
 1912 - Mexico North Western Railway (Ciudad Juárez and Chihuahua) in operation.
 1913 - Battle of Ciudad Juárez (1913).
 1919 - Battle of Ciudad Juárez (1919).
 1922 - Teatro-Cine Alcazar (theatre) opens.
 1930 - Quevedo crime gang active.
 1933 - Cervecería Cruz Blanca (brewery) established.
 1938 – El Paso Ysleta Port of Entry, USA, established.
 1940
 Teófilo Borunda becomes mayor.
 Population: 48,881.
Following the 1940 Sun Bowl, the local Knights of Columbus in El Paso took the Catholic University Cardinals over the border for lunch in the "squalid but colorful Mexican town" of Ciudad Juárez.
 1942 - Ysleta–Zaragoza Bridge rebuilt.
 1943 - El Fronterizo newspaper begins publication.
 1946 - Cámara Nacional de la Industria de Transformación de Ciudad Juárez, CANACINTRA established*
 1947 - A modified V2-rocket launched from White Sands crashed south of Tepeyac Cemetery. Although it caused a big crater no people were killed and only minor damages on buildings occurred .
 1947 - Cine Plaza (cinema) opens.
 1950 - Population: 122,598.
 1957 - Roman Catholic Diocese of Ciudad Juárez established.
 1958 -  established.
 1964 - Instituto Tecnológico de Ciudad Juárez established.
 1967
 Paso del Norte International Bridge built.
 U.S.-Mexico Chamizal land dispute resolved.
 1968 - RCA Corporation maquila begins operating.
 1970 -  (park) created.
 1973 - Universidad Autónoma de Ciudad Juárez established.
 1974 - Asociacion de Maquiladoras (labor group) founded.
 1976 - El Diario de Juárez newspaper in publication.
 1980
 XHIJ-TV begins broadcasting.
 Grupo Intermedia television company established.
 Population: 567,365 municipality.
 1981 - Estadio Olímpico Benito Juárez (stadium) opens.
 1982 - Nipona maquila begins operating.
 1983 - El Colegio de la Frontera Norte (institute) regional headquarters established.
 1988 - Club de Fútbol Cobras (football club) active.
 1990
 Norte newspaper in publication.
  opens.
 Population: 798,499 municipality.
 1995 - Population: 1,011,786 municipality.
 1998 - Bridge of the Americas (El Paso–Ciudad Juárez) opened.
 2000
 XHEM-FM radio begins broadcasting.
 Mormon temple built.
 Museo de la Lealtad Republicana (museum) opens.

21st century

 2001 -  football club formed.
 2003 - Frontera Women's Foundation established.
 2004
 Museo del Concorde opens.
 International news media reports on ongoing Female homicides in Ciudad Juárez area.
 Héctor ¨Teto¨ Murguía Lardizábal becomes mayor of Juárez Municipality.
 2005 - Indios de Ciudad Juárez (football club) formed.
 2007 - José Reyes Ferriz becomes mayor of Juárez Municipality.
 2008 - Juárez Hoy newspaper begins publication.
 2009
 March: "Warfare erupts between rival drug gangs."
 2 September: Ciudad Juárez rehab center attack.
 2010
 31 January: Villas de Salvárcar massacre.
 Héctor ¨Teto¨ Murguía Lardizábal becomes mayor of Juárez Municipality again.
 Population: 1,321,004 city; 1,332,131 municipality.
 2013
  begins operating.
  installed.
 Enrique Serrano Escobar becomes mayor of Juárez Municipality.
 2014 - Railroad hub opens in nearby Santa Teresa, New Mexico, USA.
 2016 - Pope Francis visits Ciudad Juárez in February.

See also
 Ciudad Juárez history
 List of municipal presidents of Juárez
 Chihuahua (state) history
 History of Chihuahua state (in Spanish)
 Timeline of El Paso, Texas, USA

References

This article incorporates information from the Spanish Wikipedia.

Bibliography

in English

in Spanish

External links

 Digital Public Library of America, USA. Items related to Ciudad Juárez, various dates

ciudad juarez
 
Ciudad Juarez